The National Rugby League's Charity Shield match is an annual pre-season game between the South Sydney Rabbitohs and St. George Illawarra Dragons played before the start of the Premiership regular season. It has been regarded as the unofficial start to the National Rugby League (NRL) season and has been in operation since 1982, with the exception of 2000 and 2001 when Souths were omitted from the NRL.

Originally contested between South Sydney and St. George, and later by the St. George Illawarra Dragons when they formed a joint-venture with Illawarra in 1998 before the 1999 NRL season, the teams go head to head in an annual clash prior to the kickoff of the NRL season.

Since its inception in 1982, the Charity Shield has been played on forty occasions. Of these, the Dragons (St George  and St George Illawarra) have won 17 times, while the Rabbitohs, South Sydney have triumphed outright on 18 occasions.  South Sydney holds the shield having won the most recent match in February 2023. Broken down, St George played 17 matches, winning 11; while St George Illawarra, since their joint-venture in 1999, have played 22 matches, winning 6.

The match has been broadcast on national television and in 2002 and 2021 was screened live in the UK.  The Charity Shield is for Souths Cares, Wollongong Hospital and St George Hospital.

Head To Head

Match results

Biggest wins

Most points scored in a game by a winning side

Most points scored in a game by a losing side

Most points scored in a game

Least points scored in a game

See also

Rivalries in the National Rugby League

References

External links
Sydney competitions
Wayback Machine: Archived version of Geocities page of Charity Shield Games 1982–2009
Rabbitohs South Sydney Rabbitohs

St. George Illawarra Dragons matches
South Sydney Rabbitohs matches
Rugby league competitions in New South Wales
Rugby league trophies and awards
Rugby league rivalries
National Rugby League
Rugby league in Sydney
Recurring sporting events established in 1982
1982 establishments in Australia
St. George Dragons
Sports rivalries in Australia